White mangrove may refer to several species of plants, including:

 Avicennia marina, occurring around the Indian Ocean and into the western Pacific Ocean as far as New Zealand
 Laguncularia racemosa, occurring on both sides of the Atlantic Ocean and along the eastern edge of the Pacific Ocean